2001 Supercupa României was the 5th edition of Romania's season opener cup competition, Supercupa României. The match was played in Bucharest at Stadionul Naţional on 2 March 2002, and was contested between Divizia A title holders, Steaua and Cupa României champions, Dinamo. The super cup final was held in mid season just before the start of its second half. This final was the most attended Supercup final in Romania with over 50,000 spectators. Steaua won the trophy for the 4th time after a double from Trică, Niculescu's goal for Dinamo being insufficient to change the outcome of the game.

Match

Details

References

External links
Romania - List of Super Cup Finals, RSSSF.com

Supercupa
Supercupa României
FC Steaua București matches
2001